The Basketball Cup of Bosnia and Herzegovina is the national women's basketball cup of Bosnia and Herzegovina. It has been played since 2002.

History

Cup winners
 Official list confirmed by FIBA for all Bosnia and Herzegovina

Champions of regional cups
 Official list confirmed by FIBA for national regional cups before 2002/03

Cup of KSBiH

Cup of Republika Srpska

Cup League of Herzeg-Bosnia

Performance by club
 Including titles in SFR Yugoslavia and Bosnia and Herzegovina

References

External links

Basketball competitions in Bosnia and Herzegovina
Bosnia and Herzegovina
Recurring sporting events established in 2002
2002 establishments in Bosnia and Herzegovina
Cup